Douglas James Meintjes (9 June 1890 – 17 July 1979) was a South African cricketer who played in two Test matches in 1923. He played first-class cricket for Transvaal from 1910 to 1926.

References

External links
 

1890 births
1979 deaths
South Africa Test cricketers
South African cricketers
Gauteng cricketers